Livadiya may refer to:
Livadiya, Crimea, an urban-type settlement in Crimea
Livadiya, Primorsky Krai, a former urban settlement in Primorsky Krai, Russia, part of the city of Nakhodka